Usui is a japanese term for yushui, one of 24 solar terms.

Usui may also refer to :

 a japanese surname.
 a mountain pass between Gunma and Nagano prefectures in Japan.
 a former district in the same country.
 a former town also in Japan.
 the japanese author Usui Kojima (1873–1948).

See also 
 All pages with prefix "usui".